Hassan Toriss (born 10 November 1992) is a Moroccan long-distance runner. In 2020, he competed in the men's race at the 2020 World Athletics Half Marathon Championships held in Gdynia, Poland.

References

External links 
 

Living people
1992 births
Place of birth missing (living people)
Moroccan male long-distance runners